The 2016–17 Alabama State Hornets basketball team represented Alabama State University during the 2016–17 NCAA Division I men's basketball season. The Hornets, led by 12th-year head coach Lewis Jackson, played their home games at the Dunn–Oliver Acadome in Montgomery, Alabama as members of the Southwestern Athletic Conference. They finished the season 8–23, 6–12 in SWAC play to finish in a tie for eighth place. As the No. 8 seed in the SWAC tournament, they lost to Texas Southern in the quarterfinals.

Previous season
The Hornets finished the 2015–16 season 14–17, 9–9 in SWAC play to finish in fifth place. They lost to Southern in the quarterfinals of the SWAC tournament.

Roster

Schedule and results

|-
!colspan=8 style=| Exhibition

|-
!colspan=8 style=| Non-conference regular season

|-
!colspan=9 style=|SWAC regular season

|-
!colspan=8 style=| SWAC tournament

References

Alabama State
Alabama State Hornets basketball seasons
Alabama State Hornets basketball
Alabama State Hornets basketball